William George Bock (born June 11, 1884, in Port Elgin, Ontario, Canada – d. March 28, 1973) was a Canadian politician and farmer. He was elected in a November 25, 1927 by-election, after the resignation of George Spence on October 14, as a Member of the Liberal Party to represent the riding of Maple Creek. He was defeated in the 1930 election. In total, he served 976 Days (2 years, 8 months, 3 days) in federal service. After his political career, he authored two books called The Book of Humbug and The Book of Skeletons, published in 1958 and 1960 respectively, by Modern Press.

References

1884 births
1973 deaths
Liberal Party of Canada MPs
Members of the House of Commons of Canada from Saskatchewan